The 17th Robert Awards ceremony was held in 2000 in Copenhagen, Denmark. Organized by the Danish Film Academy, the awards honoured the best in Danish and foreign film of 1999.

Honorees

Best Danish Film 
 Den eneste ene – Susanne Bier

Best Screenplay 
 Kim Fupz Aakeson – Den eneste ene

Best Actor in a Leading Role 
 Niels Olsen – Den eneste ene

Best Actress in a Leading Role 
 Sidse Babett Knudsen – Den eneste ene

Best Actor in a Supporting Role 
 Jesper Asholt – Mifunes sidste sang

Best Actress in a Supporting Role 
 Sofie Gråbøl – Den eneste ene

Best Cinematography 
 Dirk Brüel –

Best Production Design 
 Karl Juliusson –

Best Costume Design 
 Katja Watkins –

Best Makeup 
 John Janne Kindahl –

Best Special Effects 
 Hummer Højmark – I Kina spiser de hunde

Best Sound Design 
 Niels Arild –

Robert Award for Best Light 
 Jacob Marlow & Emil Sparre-Ulrich – Bleeder

Best Editing 
 Valdis Oskarsdottir – Mifunes sidste sang

Best Score 
 Søren Hyldgaard & Jesper Winge Leisner – Den eneste ene

Best Documentary Short 
 Jeg er levende – Jørgen Leth

Best Short Featurette 
 Solen er så rød – Jens Arentzen

Non-American Film 
 All About My Mother by  Pedro Almodóvar & Life Is Beautiful by Roberto Benigni

Best American Film 
 The Straight Story – David Lynch

See also 

 2000 Bodil Awards

References

External links 
  

1999 film awards
2000 in Denmark
Robert Awards ceremonies
2000 in Copenhagen